Norway House Water Aerodrome  is located adjacent to Norway House, Manitoba, Canada.

See also
Norway House Airport

References

Registered aerodromes in Manitoba
Seaplane bases in Manitoba